Ağzıkaraca is a village in the District of İmamoğlu, Adana Province, Turkey. It had a population of 343 as of 2014.

References

Villages in İmamoğlu District